Muratpaşa Belediyesi SK is the women's handball team of the same named club sponsored by the Municipality of Muratpaşa in Antalya, Turkey. The team play in the Turkish Super League. Club colors are orange, navy and white.

Competitions

Domestic
The team finished the 2010–11 season ranking at third place. Subsequently, they became three times champion of the Turkish Handball Super League in serie. At the end of the 2014–15 season, Muratpaşa Bld. SK lost the final play-offs to Yenimahalle Bld. SK and became runner-up.

International
They won the semifinals at the 2011–12 Women's EHF Challenge Cup defeating the French team CJF Fleury by 67-68 in total. Muratpaşa Bld. S played the semifinals at the 2014–15 Women's EHF Cup, lost however to the Danish Team Tvis Holstebro by 49-67 in total. In 2014, they took part at the 2014 Bucharest Trophy without success. The team failed to advance to the quarterfinals at the 2015–16 Women's EHF Cup losing to the German HC Leipzig by 51-69 in the knockout stage.

European record

Squad
As of July 2017

Goalkeepers
  Sevilay İmamoğlu Öcal 
  Merve Durdu
  Selen Akalin

Wings
  Yasemin Şahin
  Gülsüm Güleçyüz 
  Kübra Katar

Pivots
  Valeriia Baranik
  Cansu Akalin

Backs
  Yeliz Ozel
  Marina Tankaskaya
  Yuliya Snopova
  Berfin Yayli
  Döne Gül Bozdogan
  Ecem Birben
  Ayse Dinç
  Ceren Coskun
  Betül Karaaslan

Former notable players

Honours
Turkish Handball Super League
 Winners (4): 2011–12, 2012–13, 2013–14, 2017-2018.	
 Runners-up (1): 2014–15.
 Third places (1): 2010–11.

References

 
Turkish handball clubs
Women's handball in Turkey
Women's handball clubs